The Young Ones is a soundtrack album by Cliff Richard and the Shadows to the film of the same name. It is their first soundtrack album and Richard's sixth album overall. It was produced by Norrie Paramor, with music by Ronald Cass and Stanley Black. The album topped the UK Albums Chart for six weeks (with another eleven weeks at number two) and charted for 42 weeks in total when the chart was a top twenty. The album became the first UK soundtrack to sell more than one million copies in total, combining UK and international sales.

Three singles were released from the album, the first two prior to the album release. "When the Girl in Your Arms is the Girl in Your Heart" was released in October 1961 and reached number 3 in the UK Singles Chart. The Shadows' instrumental, "The Savage", was released in November and reached number 10. Lastly, "The Young Ones" was released in January 1962 and, with half a million pre-orders, debuted at number 1. It spent 6 weeks at the summit, going on to sell a million in the UK and become Richard's biggest selling single in the country.

In North America, the album was released under the title Wonderful to Be Young, with the addition of the "Wonderful to Be Young" track which was also released as a single, reaching number 16 on the Canadian CHUM Chart.

Track listing
All songs by Cliff Richard and the Shadows, unless otherwise listed.

"Friday Night" (A.B.S. Orchestra, The Michael Sammes Singers)
"Got a Funny Feeling"
"Peace Pipe" (The Shadows)
"Nothing's Impossible" (Cliff Richard and Grazina Frame, A.B.S. Orchestra) 
"The Young Ones"
"All for One" (Cliff Richard, The Michael Sammes Singers, A.B.S. Orchestra)
"Lessons in Love"
"No One for Me But Nicky" (Grazina Frame, A.B.S. Orchestra)
"What D'You Know, We've Got a Show & Vaudeville Routine / Have a Smile for Everyone You Meet / Tinkle, Tinkle, Tinkle / Algy the Piccadilly Johnny / Captain Ginjah / Joshuah / Where Did You Get That Hat / What D'You Know, We've Got a Show / Living Doll" (Cliff Richard, The Michael Sammes Singers, A.B.S. Orchestra)
"When the Girl in Your Arms Is the Girl in Your Heart" (Cliff Richard, Norrie Paramor Orchestra)
"Mambo: A) Just Dance B) Mood Mambo" (The Michael Sammes Singers, A.B.S. Orchestra)
"The Savage" (The Shadows)
"We Say Yeah"

Personnel
Cliff Richard and the Shadows
Cliff Richard – lead vocals
Hank Marvin – lead guitar
Bruce Welch – rhythm guitar
Jet Harris – bass guitar
Tony Meehan – drums
Grazina Frame - female lead role (portrayed by Carole Gray in the film)
Ronald Cass - Composer
Mike Sammes Singers - backing singers

Chart performance

References

External links
http://www.cliffandshads.co.uk/ Cliff Richard discography

Musical film soundtracks
Cliff Richard albums
The Shadows albums
1961 soundtrack albums
Albums produced by Norrie Paramor
EMI Columbia Records soundtracks